Samuel Fränkel (22 November 1801 – 28 July 1881) was a German industrialist.

Life 
Samuel Fränkel was born 22 November 1801 in Zülz (currently Biała, Poland). In 1827 he moved to Neustadt O.S. (currently Prudnik). He founded a linen and terrycloth factory in 1845, at the shore of Prudnik river. It quickly became one of the biggest terrycloth factories in Europe. Fränkel opened a few branches in Berlin and Augsburg. The company was confiscated from the Fränkel family by Nazis in 1938, under the Nuremberg Laws that prohibited German Jews from owning property. Post-war, the company reopened under the name Zakłady Przemysłu Bawełnianego "Frotex".

Family 
He was a grandfather of Max Pinkus.

Death 
Samuel Fränkel died 28 July 1881 in Neustadt O.S.

References 

1801 births
1881 deaths
German industrialists
19th-century German Jews
19th-century German businesspeople
People from Prudnik County